The 2005 Tommy Murphy Cup was the 2nd staging of the Tommy Murphy Cup, the Gaelic Athletic Association's secondary inter-county Gaelic football tournament. The draw for the preliminary round fixtures took place on 9 July 2005. The championship began on 16 July 2005 and ended on 4 September 2005.

Clare were the defending champions but they did not enter the championship.

On 4 September 2005, Tipperary won the championship following a 3-10 to 0-15 defeat of Wexford in the final. This was their first Tommy Murphy Cup title.

Wexford's Mattie Forde was the championship's top scorer with 2-14.

Teams

Summaries

Withdrawals

In July Carlow manager Liam Hayes was forced to pull his side out of the championship due to the unavailability of the majority of his first-choice squad. Hayes made the decision as 12 of his panel were injured and four dual players decided to line out for the Carlow hurlers.

In August the Antrim County Board took the decision to withdraw from the championship due to a full club hurling fixture list, injuries and players on holidays.

Results

Preliminary round

Quarter-finals

Semi-finals

Final

Top scorers

Overall

Single game

References

Tommy Murphy Cup
Tommy Murphy Cup